A list of veins in the human body:
Veins of the heart
Coronary sinus
Great cardiac vein
Oblique vein of left atrium
Middle cardiac vein
Small cardiac vein
Pulmonary veins
Superior vena cava
Brachiocephalic vein
Inferior thyroid vein
Inferior laryngeal vein
Pericardial veins
Pericardiophrenic veins
Bronchial veins
Vertebral vein
Occipital vein
Anterior vertebral vein
Deep cervical vein
Internal thoracic veins
Superior epigastric veins
Musculophrenic veins
Anterior intercostal veins
Supreme intercostal vein
Internal jugular vein
Lingual vein
Dorsal lingual veins
Sublingual vein
Deep lingual vein
Superior thyroid vein
Middle thyroid veins
Sternocleidomastoid vein
Superior laryngeal vein
Facial vein
Angular vein
Supratrochlear veins
Supra-orbital vein
External nasal veins
Deep facial vein
External palatine vein
Submental vein
Retromandibular vein
Superficial temporal veins
Middle temporal vein
Transverse facial vein
Maxillary veins
Pterygoid plexus
External jugular vein
Posterior auricular vein
Anterior jugular vein
Suprascapular vein
Transverse cervical veins
Dural venous sinuses
Transverse sinus
Confluence of sinuses
Marginal sinus
Occipital sinus
Petrosquamous sinus
Sigmoid sinus
Superior sagittal sinus
Inferior sagittal sinus
Straight sinus
Inferior petrosal sinus
Superior petrosal sinus
Cavernous sinus
Sphenoparietal sinus
Diploic veins
Emissary veins
Cerebral veins
Superficial cerebral veins
Internal cerebral veins
Basal vein
Great cerebral vein
Veins of brainstem
Cerebellar veins
Orbital veins
Superior ophthalmic vein
Nasofrontal vein
Ethmoidal veins
Lacrimal vein
Vorticose veins
Ciliary veins
Central retinal vein
Episcleral vein
Inferior ophthalmic vein
Azygos vein
Posterior intercostal veins
Intervertebral vein
Veins of vertebral column
Anterior internal vertebral venous plexus
Basivertebral veins
Anterior spinal veins
Posterior spinal veins
Veins of upper limb
Subclavian vein
Axillary vein
Subscapular vein
Circumflex scapular vein
Thoracodorsal vein
Posterior circumflex humeral vein
Anterior circumflex humeral vein
Lateral thoracic vein
Superficial veins of upper limb
Cephalic vein
Basilic vein
Median cubital vein
Dorsal venous network of hand
Deep veins of upper limb
Brachial veins
Ulnar veins
Radial veins
Inferior vena cava
Inferior phrenic veins
Lumbar veins
Ascending lumbar vein
Hepatic veins
Renal veins
Left suprarenal vein
Left ovarian vein
Left testicular vein
Right suprarenal vein
Right ovarian vein
Right testicular vein
Pampiniform plexus
Common iliac vein
Median sacral vein
Iliolumbar vein
Internal iliac vein
Superior gluteal veins
Inferior gluteal veins
Obturator veins
Lateral sacral veins
Vesical veins
Middle rectal veins
Internal pudendal vein
Deep veins of clitoris
Deep veins of penis
Inferior rectal veins
Posterior labial veins
Posterior scrotal veins
External iliac vein
Inferior epigastric vein
Deep circumflex iliac vein
Veins of lower limb
Superficial veins of lower limb
Great saphenous vein
External pudendal veins
Small saphenous vein
Deep veins of lower limb
Femoral vein
Profunda femoris vein
Popliteal vein
Sural veins
Anterior tibial veins
Posterior tibial veins
Fibular veins
Hepatic portal vein
Cystic vein
Para-umbilical veins
Left gastric vein
Right gastric vein
Superior mesenteric vein
Right gastro-omental vein
Ileocolic vein
Appendicular vein
Right colic vein
Middle colic vein
Splenic vein
Left gastro-omental vein
Inferior mesenteric vein
Left colic vein
Sigmoid veins
Superior rectal vein

Veins
Veins
Veins